Islanders Iceworks is a multipurpose ice hockey facility in Syosset, New York, containing two regulation-sized NHL rinks. It is owned and operated by the New York Islanders, an NHL team, and is used primarily as a practice facility. Additionally the arena is available to the local community for a variety of reasons, including 'learning to skate', house leagues and summer camps.

After founding both a men's and women's ice hockey team, Long Island University reached an agreement with the New York Islanders to use the Iceworks as their primary home rink.

The Islander's former owner Charles Wang purchased the Iceworks out of bankruptcy in 2015 for $8 million.

References

Indoor arenas in New York (state)
College ice hockey venues in the United States
Indoor ice hockey venues in the United States
New York Islanders venues
Sports venues in New York (state)
Sports venues in Nassau County, New York

External links
 Official Website